Zig Zag is a 2002 American drama film directed and written by David S. Goyer (in his directorial debut) and starring John Leguizamo, Wesley Snipes, Oliver Platt, and Natasha Lyonne. It is based on the 1999 novel Zigzag by Landon J. Napoleon. The film premiered at the 2002 South by Southwest Film Festival.

Plot
Dean Singer (John Leguizamo) has terminal cancer, yet is determined to spend his last days taking care of his 15-year-old autistic protégé from the Big Brother program, Louis "Zig Zag" Fletcher (Sam Jones III). Dean got Louis a dishwasher job in shamelessly abusive, exploitative Mr. Walters' (Oliver Platt) restaurant. Louis' dead-beat, neglecting yet abusive dad pushes him for "rent", which he actually uses to repay violent loan-shark Cadillac Tom (Luke Goss). Zig Zag gets it by stealing from Walters' safe, remembering numbers being his only talent. Singer is determined to return the money, despite excessive risks, with surprising allies.

Cast

Production

Filming
The film was shot in Los Angeles, California.

Reception

Box office
The film was released in one theater and earned $1,649 in its opening weekend. The total US box office gross for Zig Zag was $2,418.

Critical response
On Rotten Tomatoes the film has an approval rating of 44% based on reviews from 16 critics. On Metacritic, the film has a score of 58% based on reviews from 10 critics, indicating "mixed or average reviews".

References

External links
 

2002 films
2002 directorial debut films
Films directed by David S. Goyer
Films with screenplays by David S. Goyer
2002 drama films
American drama films
Franchise Pictures films
Films based on American novels
Films produced by Elie Samaha
Films about autism
2000s English-language films
2000s American films